Pearl, occasionally known as Pearl Liaison, is the stage name of American drag performer and record producer Matthew James Lent, who came to international attention on the seventh season of RuPaul's Drag Race, finishing joint runner-up.

Early life
Lent grew up in St. Petersburg, Florida with his mother and two sisters. He spent time drawing "rich old ladies with big diamond rings and furs", which eventually morphed into his drag persona.

Drag career
After moving to Chicago, Lent began performing in drag in 2012, alongside Kim Chi and Trixie Mattel, using the stage name Pearl. He has described Pearl's persona as a "Stepford wife robot bitch". Lent initially only planned to use drag as a hobby, but quickly began booking gigs at increasing frequency. He later moved to Brooklyn, New York.

In December 2014, Pearl was announced to be a participant on the seventh season of the Logo TV reality television series RuPaul's Drag Race. Despite a slow start to the competition, Pearl rebounded to win two main challenges, and eventually became a finalist alongside fellow competitors Ginger Minj and Violet Chachki. In the season finale, Violet Chachki was crowned the winner, leaving Pearl as a runner-up. After the series, Pearl claimed that her lack of enthusiasm towards the show while appearing on it was due to an early negative comment towards her by RuPaul which was not filmed - as a result, she says she has not been invited back for an All Stars series.

Pearl has been described as the drag mother of Scarlet Envy, who appeared on season 11 of RuPaul's Drag Race. Pearl denied this in an interview in July 2019, describing Scarlet as a good friend of hers.

Other ventures

Music
On June 2, 2015, Lent released the album Pleasure, along with a music video for its first single, "Love Slave". Unlike other albums released by Drag Race alumni, Pleasure does not feature any vocals from Lent; he instead produced the entire album. The album charted at number eleven on the US Billboard Dance/Electronic Albums chart and number sixteen on the Heatseekers chart.

Perfume
On June 2, 2015, Lent announced the release of a fragrance, Flazéda, with perfume company Xyrena. In doing so, he became the first Drag Race alumnus member to release a scent. The fragrance started shipping on June 30, 2015.

Discography

Albums

Singles

Other appearances

Filmography

Television

Web series

Music videos

Music video appearances

See also 
 LGBT culture in New York City
 List of LGBT people from New York City

References

External links

  Archived from the original on July 16, 2015.
 
 Pearl discography on Discogs

Living people
American drag queens
LGBT DJs
People from St. Petersburg, Florida
RuPaul's Drag Race contestants
1990 births